is the protagonist of the manga Vinland Saga by Makoto Yukimura. Thorfinn is introduced teenage warrior in Askeladd's company, though he hates his commander for slaying his father Thors and has sworn to kill him in a duel. To earn the right to engage in these duels, he must complete difficult feats for Askeladd, such as sabotage or the killing of enemy generals. After over a decade of being a Viking, the grown up Thorfinn starts questioning his actions and reflects on his original dream of a land without violence.

Based on Thorfinn Karlsefni, Makoto Yukimura created the fictional character as a soldier who does horrible actions as viking and would grow up to be more caring in latter chapters of the manga in order to understand other people and redeem himself. He was heavily influenced by King of Norway Olaf Tryggvason. In the anime adaptation of Vinland Saga, multiple voice actors used their talent to portray Thorfinn's both child and older personas.

Initial critical response to Thorfinn was mixed as althought his backstory and lose of innocence was considered tragic, his personality was critized for his rude demeanor. Nevertheless, his fight scenes were praised. The protagonist's growth across the following story arcs was praised for giving the character further depths most notably when living as a slave ownards. The voice actors behind Thorfinn were also praised.

Creation
The concept of Thorfinn, according to manga author Makoto Yukimura, is that of a protagonist fated to do violent actions. Thorfinn was loosely based on the historical personage of early Vinland explorer Thorfinn Karlsefni. The real Thorfinn attracted Yukimura when reading a book about such person. The fact that there is little information involving his history motivated him to use as the protagonist because he would have more freedom. Several fans asked Yukimura about Thorfinn's birthday. However, Yukimura replied that he did not give him Thorfinn canonical birthdays, as they are based on historical people whose exact birth dates are not known. Nevertheless, he shared that his Thorfinn's birthday is February 3.

Yukimura's editor was against the idea of Thorfinn being a slave so he was changed into a Viking. The author agreed as he wanted to Thorfinn to understand the causes of tragedy by being a Viking in later parts of the narrative. He wanted the protagonist to be shaved by violence, having often poor luck. Yukimura believes Thorfinn's growth with fellow viking Askeladd was pretty well executed. Yukimura insists that when writing the characters, most of them are who Thorfinn need with Askeladd being a rare exception as he is both Thorfinn's mentor and an enemy at the same time. Their relationship is also meant to look like father and son as during the beginning of the series, Yukimura was planning Askeladd's death and how Thorfinn would react to that. Another complicated relationship involves Einar and Thorfinn as the two cannot help each other due to dark narrative they are involved. Across several things Thorfinn does in the manga, one of them was learning the effects of revenge and how it affects others. 

One thing the staff talked talked about was what kind of condition Thorfinn was in as he returned from the events of the season finale. They could not use him effectively as a character without working out just how much savagery remained in him. Thorfinn and Einar's relationship was also an essential part of the story in terms of its watchability and entertainment factor, so they were glad they spent so much time on it. The relationship between Thorfinn and Einar was seen as one of the strongest parts from the anime as the writers were looking forward to seeing their parallels and what kind of lives to they have.

While Thorfinn's design changes across the manga, Yukimura gave attention to the several cuts in Thorfinn's hands as a result as a sign of always fighting alone. Meanwhile, Thorfinn becomes an adult in the second story arc, but he shaves his beard. The author explained the reasons for Thorfinn losing his beard was that it made him look strong and instead wanted him to look weak.

Casting
Japanese voice actor Yūto Uemura describes the character of Thorfinn as too violent as a result of his revenge quest. Due to Thorfinn's personality changing for the anime's second season, Uemura was conflicted with how should sound in order to fit the protagonist. He often had discussions with the director during recordings where he insisted that Thorfinn's violent side can still be seen but wanted his portrayal to be one of a lost person. The director was pleased with the first season Thorfinn so he was confident Uemura would properly voice him in the second season. As a result, the voice actor decided that for the second season, he would constantly show the two sides of Thorfinn's personality. In retrospective, Uemura enjoyed the fight sequences Thorfinn always had in the first season despite the brutal actions he did. He looks forward to how his character would befriend the new character of Einar, having learned that Einar would generate a major impact in the protagonist. Uemura had to retake several of his interactions with Naoya Uchiha, the voice actor behind Askeladd.

Shizuka Ishigami voices Thorfinn as a child. She had learned about this work when she was offered an audition. She heard that the audition was playing an innocent child, so when I glanced at the script, she remembered being shocked when I was told with Thofinn's deaththreat despite his age. After that, she became concerned about the character's changes to become Uemura's incarnation. She does not think she has seen a characters with so many emotions in catharsis. Ishigami noted that for the television series several of the director's request were too violent as a result of the expressions Thorfinn has.

For the English dub, Mike Haimoto voices Thorfinn. He was surprised by the amount of violence. Director Kyle Jones oversaw the English actor for the recordings who wanted Haimoto to fit the character. Haimoto claims he was lucky to have received this work. The actor was surprised by the fight choreography and the screams he often performs. The actor did research through the internet to learn more about Thorfinn's character whom he felt was too different from the rest of the characters featured in the anime. He was glad he got the role of protagonist, finding it unusual in his career. However, Haimoto noted that he could not Thorfinn in all of his appearances as his child persona is instead done by another actor which he found unique. He is replaced with Shannon Emerick in his childhood from the Sentai Filmworks dub. She found the work intense and emotional due to the story of Thorfinn and enjoyed seeing the relationship between her character and Thors. When the series premiered in Netflix a new English dub was made where Haimoto was replaced by 
Aleks Le. Le was grateful for being given such option as he always wanted to voice a lead character and was a fan of Vinland Saga. Laura Stahl replaces him in his childhood where she noted she had to show several vulnerable moments of him.

Characterization and themes

Early life of Thorfinn involves his desire to travel across the world in adventures but he becomes corrupted when marauders kill his father, Thors. The young becomes corrupted with rage, selling his humanity to become a warrior, something the first opening theme of the anime series highlights. Due to Thorfinn's harsh upbringing, Yukimura said there was no room for gags involving him during the first arc. As a result, he created more characters like Thorkell who are often the subject of comedy due to their contrasting personalities. In The European Middle Ages through the prism of Contemporary Japanese Literature, Maximen Denise from University of Tours noted how the lack of proper knowledge about the real life of Thorfinn in The Greenlanders and Eric the Red made Yukimura come across with a more original character for how the main character becomes a Viking during his youth, giving him a realistic characterization which contrast to Thorkell's supernatural strength. According to the writer, while Thorfinn is originally driven by revenge, the main motivation featured in manga also explore his desire to have power similar to "those who desperately struggle to find their homelands in the 21st century 'medieval' Japan". Japanese voice actor Yūto Uemura describes the character of Thorfinn as too violent as a result of his revenge quest. Due to Thorfinn's personality changing for the anime's second season, Uemura was conflicted with how should sound in order to fit the protagonist. 

One of the earliest concepts when drawing Thorfinn was making a story about a slave. Despite being a slave, Thorfinn would face several challenges and reach his goal. He was inspired by King of Norway Olaf Tryggvason who lost his position as a king to become a slave but managed to go back to his original position. Unlike Tryggvason who was highly popular, Thorfinn instead was written to face several more problems. Yukimura wanted Thorfinn to learn about oppression and human afflictions. In retrospect, Yukimura stated that Thorfinn does not have a notable skill or large body. In order to stand out as a main character, he was written to have the experience the pain human beings suffer. After Thorfinn stops being a slave, the character continues having an arc across his growth to the point that he might look unrecognizable. The Slave arc also resulted in Thorfinn doing deadpan with Einar being more expressive due to his constant wrath. 

In following arcs where Thorfinn expresses himself more frequently, Yukimura writes that the protagonist still has a thorn. The revengeful hunter Hild was made to remind Thorfinn of his sins as a viking in the same way with how the series starts with Thorfinn wanting revenge on Askeladd. Thorfinn's quest for Vinland comes from Yukimura's interested in how the people of Northern Europe reached the Americas more than 400 years earlier than Christopher Columbus' discovery. However, when he looked into it, he wondered about the Icelanders who originally came from Norway are going further and further to Greenland and Vinland. Yukimura's sensation during the Cold War and the September 11 attacks were projected on Thorfinn's character who is traumatized by his actions as a viking and thus decides to find Vinland in order to make a land where people from different races are able to live together peacefully.

Thorfinn's characterization changes once again when ending his work as slave and has a dream involving the creation of a peaceful country. This was inspired by an escape from the European society who, alongside Thorfinn, committed chaos and believe there is nothing wrong with their actions. Initially, Thorfinn hates the society but is too weak to change such a concept. This leads to how Thorfinn meets Prince Canute and wants him to accomplish his dream. Even though he stops being a warrior, the protagonist has no right to convict anyone else. No matter what kind of violent enemy meets, Thorfinn always feels that he has done something worse in the past. Yukimura believes this is how Thorfinn should be written. Thorfinn's quest of redemption once growing up is relatable to Yukimura's life due how he has been focused on his work for two decades. Once the series' fourth story arc started, Yukimura reflected on Thorfinn, telling a friend that the protagonist highlights how people can change in contrast to others like Thorkell who do not want such effect.

Yukimura's take on Thorfinn's growth is different from the one of the anime version as the manga stars as a flashback while the anime's take is direct. In episode six, the staff revealed the process of how Thorfinn gained the ability to fight as well as his internal feelings in East Anglia. The staff thought the scene showed him truly stepping into the world of battle as part of Askeladd's band, showing his transformation into a warrior. Writer Hiroshi Seko enjoyed the first fight between Thorfinn and Thorkell as a result due to how action packed it was. The anime's second season added more content about Thorfinn's sins in the form of nightmares where his past persona committes murders and as soon as he enters into a house of his victims; He is replaced by his slave persona who is in shock upon seeing it due to the realization of his sins which was praised by Yukimura for how well did Mappa understand Thorfinn's mind.

Appearances

Vinland Saga
Thorfinn is introduced as a young Viking who works for Askeladd in attempts to kill him as revenge for killing his father, Thors. As a child, Thorfinn is portrayed in flashbacks as an innocent child from Iceland who wanted to visit Vinland after listening to the adventurer Leif Erickson and sneaked into Thors' journey for fun which resulted into he seeing his death under Askeladd's forces. Askeladd's company find employment in 1013 AD as mercenaries under the Danish King Sweyn in the Danish invasion of London while the British are aided by Thorkell the Tall, Thorfinn's uncle who served with Thors in the Jomsvikings. Askeladd kills Sweyn during an audience when the kind announced his plan to invade Wales, feigning madness as prince Canute kills so the prince could take over Dane-occupied England without question. An angered Thorfinn attacks the prince but is stopped by Thorkell.

A year after Askeladd's death, Thorfinn works in a farm owned by Ketil, who treats slaves well. He also befriends a slave named Einar who teaches him how to farm. With Einar's help along with Snake, the farm's head of security, and Ketil's father Sverker, Thorfinn learns to let go of his dark past pursues a life of peace and away from the Vikings' violent lifestyle. Canute renounces his claim to attack the farm after seeing the pacifist Thorfinn has become. With Thorfinn and Einar freed, they say their goodbyes to their friends before sailing back to Iceland with Leif, an old friend of Thorfinn's father.

Reunited with his family, Thorfinn explains his intent to settle Vinland and build a new life of peace. In order to gain the funding for the trip to Vinland, Thorfinn's group plans to travel to Greece and sell Narwhal horns there. Thorfinn's crew include new allies, the hunter Hild whose parents were killed by Thorfinn, the young woman named Gudrid who seeks to live Thorfinn's life and Karli, a baby whose parents were recently killed and Thorfinn aims to protect. This makes Sigurd, Gudrid's fiance, search for them. They manage to escape but are still confronted by Floki who is nearly killed by Thorfinn when learning he orchestrated his father's death. Thorfinn and Hild draw away the assassins around a set of islands while the rest of the crew escape toward Odense. Thorfinn is temporarily made leader of the Jomsvikings and carries out orders from Canute to disband the Jomsvikings and spare Floki and Baldr from execution. Gudrid, admitting her feelings for Thorfinn, talks Thorkell out of a duel that Thorfinn promised him and continue their journey to Greece.

Two years later, Thorfinn's crew return to Iceland with the wealth they acquired from selling the narwhal horns. Thorfinn and Gudrid get married and raise Karli as their son. With the resources promised by Halfdan, Thorfinn begins to assemble a crew to colonize Vinland. After reaching a new land, Thorfinn makes peace with natives and starts working on lands with his family. Four years later, it is revealed that Gudrid is pregnant with his child. Nevertheless, Thorfinn continuously faces conflict with his people who want weapons to protect themselves.

Other appearances
Thorfinn has appeared in a collaboration with Zombie Land Saga in 2019 as a chibi persona. He is also present in a crossover manga with Assassin's Creed Valhalla where he meets Eivor. He was also parodied in VAP's web anime Ponkotsu Quest. He is also present in a crossover with the card game Lord of Vermilion.

Reception

Critical response
Early response to Thorfinn's character focused on his tragic characterization with Anime News Network noting his change of personality once his father is killed by Askeladd. ComicsWorthReading said that Thorfinn is a sad character due to how he idolizes his father in his introduction and how several of his actions resulted in his death. His misrelationship with Askeladd was often found by critics to turn him into a pawn as well as a failure to avenge his father across several chapters. His action scenes were praised but critics mentioned his lack of character arc. On a more negative response, Anime UK News criticized the early characterization of Thorfinn for his dark traits such as his moody stares or angst portrayed. Polygon compared Thorfinn to The Northmans protagonists due to their similar quests for revenge and how both are based on historical figures. Polygon further praised the relationship between Thorfinn and Askeladd as the former sees him as both as his biggest enemy and a father figure at the same time due to the time they spend together. Thorfinn's constant questions about his father's death was noted to be the most important part of the anime series since Thorfinn is unable to leave his past behind. The eventual ending of the first season of the anime led to major praise from the media in regards to how the writers handled Thorfinn's character arc as he questions his own revenge when Askeladd sees him in a sympathetic form during his last moments.

Following Askebadd's death, critics were surprised by Thorfinn's quieter personality and noted that despite his life as a slave, the plot manages to make his life with other slaves interesting. Both Anime News Network and Fandom Post acclaimed the episode where Thorfinn realizes mistakes of his life as a Viking and makes an oath to never use violence again with the former site calling it the "defining episode of the entire series" due to the impact it has on the protagonist. Comic Book Resources similarly said the series' audience will be surprised to see him turn into a pacifist soldier but still has problem interacting with other people to the point he fails to start a romantic relationship with women interested in him. Sportskeeda noted that Thorfinn's character arc into a pacifist is highly notable in how it changes his characterization to the point of calling it one of most interesting from seinen manga. with Manga News commenting that the Thorfinn's pacifism are challenged as the sins he committed in his childhood are highlighted and he still fights but avoiding casualties, making a major departure from the series' first chapters. In a further analysis of the series, Comic Book Resources compared Thorfinn with the protagonists of Attack on Titan, Eren Yeager, and Rurouni Kenshin, Himura Kenshin, due to their similar struggles in their lives. His romantic relationship with Gugrid and adoption of Karli surprised Manga News and Manga Sanctuary for making his story more apppealing as well as more lighthearted with his constant values.

There was also commentary behind Thorfinn's actors. The performances of Shizuka Ishigami and Yūto Uemura were praised by Anime News Network for the amount of yells the character performs. According to voice actor Naoya Uchida (Askeladd), Uemura was quiet in the studio. He could tell that he was focusing on Thorfinn's feelings for Askeladd the most. Uchihda believes the magma-like emotions that Thorfinn held, accumulated and erupted, and he think that it was an explosive play that accumulated and erupted. Meanwhile, Akio Otsuka (Thorkell) noted that Umemura worked out carefully in order to make his dialogue fit the lipsycnh even if it was not his duty much to his surprise. Kenichiro Matsuda (Thors) also praised Ishigami due to the multiple types of emotions she is able to give Thorfinn regardless of his youth.

Popularity
Manga author Hajime Isayama said that Thorfinn is his favorite character from Vinland Saga due to his humanity and guilt. Yukimura was interested by Thorfin's life as a slave but he wondered if he could understand him more from Einar's point of view. His interest in Thorfinn's characterization initially confused about whether or not his true nature would return when meeting Canute. Eventually, Isayama felt that the Slave arc allowed Thorfinn to define himself as a character and become more likable due to how he accepts having committed too many sins and wants to atone himself. However, he specifically points how Thorfinn becomes more human the more he destroys. In response, Yukimura was worried about how readers would perceive him since he changes across the narrative. Isayama further praised Thorfinn's suffering and redemption in later chapters of the manga, claiming he was moved by it.

Thorfinn's fight against Thorkell was a nominee in the 4th Crunchyroll Anime Awards in 2020 for "Best Fight" but lost to Demon Slayer: Kimetsu no Yaiba. The fights between Thorfinn and Thorkell were found by ComicWorthReading to be ridiculously superheroic as a result of the movements the character perform, with DualShockers listing both as among the ones from the first season. Writer Hiroshi Seko believes Thorfinn's age and role in a story of vikings to be one of the series' best reasons for popularity. The character was also present in the Anitrendz poll.

References

External links
  

Comics characters introduced in 2005
Fictional assassins in comics
Fictional characters based on real people
Fictional child soldiers
Fictional farmers
Fictional Icelandic people
Fictional knife-fighters
Fictional mass murderers
Fictional mercenaries in comics
Fictional pacifists
Fictional pirates
Fictional slaves
Fictional soldiers
Fictional swordfighters in anime and manga
Fictional Vikings
Male characters in anime and manga
Male characters in television
Teenage characters in anime and manga
Teenage characters in television